Kaya Palat is a 1983 Bollywood Sci-Fi thriller film directed by Satyen Bose. The film stars Suresh Chatwal , Anoop Kumar , Tun Tun  , and Rajendra Nath . The rights to this film are owned by Children Film's Society Of India .

Plot

A brilliant post graduate  scientist, Dr. Aravind Rai  who is trying to invent a formula to make humans faster, Fellow scientist Kalicharan is jealous of him.  Accidentally  Dr.  Rai  made a dose which let him a child back. After that a police inspector too was young with him.

Cast
Rajendra Nath as Kalicharan 
Jankidas as Professor 
Anoop Kumar as Police Inspector
 Suresh Chatwal as Scientist Aravind Rai
 Shyam
 Birbal
 Praveen Paul
 Kalpana
 Meenakshi Anand
 Ashok Kumar 
 Mastar Vikas Khanna as Young Aravind
 Asha sharma
 Master Ravi Valecha

Music

References

External links
 

1983 films
1980s science fiction thriller films
Indian science fiction thriller films